Festuca parvigluma is a species of grass which can be found in Japan, Nepal, both South and North Koreas, China, Taiwan, and Northeast India.

Description
It ovary have a pubescent apex with both the flowering and fruit time from April to July.

References

parvigluma
Flora of China
Flora of East Himalaya
Flora of Japan
Flora of Korea
Flora of Nepal
Flora of Taiwan